Mari is a village and union council of Mianwali District in the Punjab province of Pakistan. It is also known as "Old Mari Indus".

The Mari is situated 2 kilometers from Mari Indus town on bank of the Indus River. It is located at 32°57'32N 71°35'7E and has an altitude of 234 m (770 ft). This village is famous for its historic ruins of Hindu civilization.

References

Union councils of Mianwali District
Populated places in Mianwali District